Maysan Road is one of the main east–west thoroughfares of Valenzuela, Philippines. It is a narrow street with only one lane in each direction making it one of the most congested streets in northern Metro Manila. The road connects the central Valenzuela barangays of Malinta, Maysan, Paso de Blas, and Bagbaguin. It was the main access road for vehicles going to Valenzuela and the Manila North Harbor from the North Luzon Expressway prior to the construction of NLEX Segment 9 (NLEX Karuhatan Link), which parallels it to the south.

Name
The street is named for the barangay it traverses near MacArthur Highway. Maysan, in turn, comes from the Filipino word "maisan" which means "corn field." It is also known by several different names depending on the barangay it goes through, such as Paso de Blas Road in Paso de Blas and Bagbaguin Road in Bagbaguin. It is also sometimes called Malinta Road as the road that originates in Barangay Malinta that goes to and from the North Luzon Expressway's Paso De Blas Interchange (formerly Malinta Interchange).

Route description

Maysan Road commences at MacArthur Highway in downtown Valenzuela where the Valenzuela City Hall, the Pamantasan ng Lungsod ng Valenzuela and the old Valenzuela station are located. It heads east and enters barangay Maysan where it passes St. Louis College of Valenzuela, Tierra Santa Memorial Park, and Maysan Elementary School. At Paso de Blas, the road intersects with T. Santiago Street and heads for the Paso de Blas Interchange of the North Luzon Expressway (NLEX). Located near this interchange is Puregold Paso de Blas (former Royal Family Mall). Between the East Service Road of NLEX and G. Molina Street, the road marks the border between Paso de Blas and Canumay East. Maysan Road terminates at the intersection with ITC Compound Road by Valenzuela's border with North Caloocan, where it continues as General Luis Street all the way to Quirino Highway and Susano Road in Novaliches, Quezon City.

References

Streets in Metro Manila
Valenzuela, Metro Manila